Results in Mathematics/Resultate der Mathematik is a peer-reviewed scientific journal that covers  all aspects of pure and applied mathematics and is published by Birkhäuser. It was established in 1978 and the editor-in-chief is Catalin Badea (University of Lille).

Abstracting and indexing 
This journal is abstracted and indexed by:
 Science Citation Index Expanded
 Mathematical Reviews
 Scopus 
 Zentralblatt Math
 Academic OneFile
 Current Contents/Physical, Chemical and Earth Sciences
 Mathematical Reviews
According to the Journal Citation Reports, the journal has a 2013 impact factor of 0.642.

References

External links 
 

Springer Science+Business Media academic journals
Mathematics journals
Publications established in 1978
English-language journals
8 times per year journals